The Crackdown is the fifth studio album by English electronic band Cabaret Voltaire, released in August 1983 jointly through record labels Some Bizzare and Virgin. It was produced by the band themselves and Flood.

Background and recording 

The Crackdown was Cabaret Voltaire's first full studio album following founding member Chris Watson's departure, and their first release for Virgin Records via Some Bizzare. This album marks a turning point in the band's discography, straddling their early experimental work with their later more conventional electronic dance-funk output. It was recorded and mixed at Trident Studios, London, England in late 1982.

AllMusic wrote that the album "features the band working a number of menacing electronic textures into a basic dance/funk rhythm".

Reception 

AllMusic described The Crackdown as "one of Cabaret Voltaire's strongest albums" and "one of their most distinctive, challenging records."

It was ranked at number 11 in NME's "Albums of the Year" list for 1983. Trouser Press, meanwhile, was less enthusiastic, accusing the album of being "rather staid-sounding" while clarifying that their indifference "shouldn't be taken as a blanket panning."

Track listing 

 Note: Some discographies and CD releases of the album swap the titles of the last two tracks of the Doublevision EP.

Release 

The original LP came with a bonus 12" of four tracks, comprising the EP Doublevision.

Personnel

Cabaret Voltaire
Stephen Mallinder – vocals, bass guitar, trumpet, grand piano
Richard H. Kirk – synthesiser, guitar, clarinet, saxophone, & shakuhachi (Japanese bamboo flute), grand piano
Alan Fish – drums, percussion

Additional Personnel
David Ball - keyboards and drum programming

Production
Executive Producer: Stevo Pearce (for Some Bizzare)
Arranged by Cabaret Voltaire
Produced by Flood and Cabaret Voltaire
Engineered and mixed by Flood
Tape Operation on "Animation" and "Crackdown" by David Ball
Single remix by John Luongo
Mastered by George Peckham
Sleeve Typography by Ken Prust and Neville Brody
Sleeve Illustration by Phil Barnes

References

External links 

 

1983 albums
Cabaret Voltaire (band) albums
Albums produced by Flood (producer)
Electro-industrial albums
Electronic body music albums
Some Bizzare Records albums
Albums recorded at Trident Studios